No Contest is a 1995 action film starring Shannon Tweed, Robert Davi and Roddy Piper. It was followed by a sequel two years later.

Plot summary

A Miss Galaxy competition is hijacked by a gang who take a number of hostages and demand diamonds as a ransom. However, the host, Sharon Bell, a kick-boxing actress, is determined to stop them.

Cast
 Shannon Tweed as Sharon Bell
 Robert Davi as Sergeant Crane
 Andrew Dice Clay as Raymond Ulysses 'Oz' Brice
 Roddy Piper as 'Ice'
 Nicholas Campbell as Vic
 John Colicos as Senator Donald Wilson
 James Purcell as Captain Henricks
 Judith Scott as Nancy Polson
 Louis Wrightman as 'Que'
 Keram Malicki-Sánchez as Cal
 J.D. Nicholsen as Zed (as Jack Nicholsen)
 Polly Shannon as Candice 'Candy' Wilson, Miss U.S.A

Reception

References

External links

1994 films
1990s action films
American action films
Canadian action films
Films about beauty pageants
Films directed by Paul Lynch
1990s English-language films
1990s American films
1990s Canadian films